Sant'Anna a Capuana is a church located on the piazza of the same name in Naples, Italy.

The church was founded in the 16th century near the former city gate at Porta Capuana, as a small chapel for the monks of the Convent of San Francesco di Paola. Construction of the present structure dates from 1751, a design by Giuseppe Astarita. The interior has a raised altar reached by a double ramp stairwell. The canvas in the cupola depicts the Holy Family with St Anne by Marco Cardisco. The organ was made in 1753, by Nicola and Carlo Mancini. The chapels were painted in the 18th century by Francesco Narici and Giovanni Cosenza.

Bibliography
 Vincenzo Regina, Le chiese di Napoli. Viaggio indimenticabile attraverso la storia artistica, architettonica, letteraria, civile e spirituale della Napoli sacra, Newton and Compton editor, Naples 2004.

External links

Roman Catholic churches in Naples
18th-century Roman Catholic church buildings in Italy
Baroque architecture in Naples